Apocynoideae is a subfamily of the flowering plant family Apocynaceae (order Gentianales). It contains about 78 genera with roughly 860 species. Several genera are of pharmacological interest - notably those - such as Strophanthus - which have furnished highly effective arrow poisons, due to their cardiac glycoside content. The subfamily includes many species with flowers of considerable ornamental value, the best-known of which is Nerium oleander, the familiar Oleander. It also contains the remarkable pachycaul genera Adenium and Pachypodium.

Genera

Gallery

References

 
Gentianales subfamilies